"Kon-Tiki" is an instrumental tune by British group the Shadows, released as a single in September 1961. It was the group's fifth hit and their second to top the UK Singles Chart.

Background and release
"Kon-Tiki" was written by Michael Carr, who had previously written "Man of Mystery" for the group. It refers to the raft used by Norwegian explorer Thor Heyerdahl on his 1947 Kon-Tiki expedition. It was released with the B-side "36-24-36", which was written by the four Shadows members.

Track listing
7": Columbia / DB 4698
 "Kon-Tiki" – 1:51
 "36-24-36" – 1:42

Personnel
 Hank Marvin – electric lead guitar
 Bruce Welch – acoustic rhythm guitar
 Jet Harris – electric bass guitar
 Tony Meehan – drums

Charts

References

1961 singles
UK Singles Chart number-one singles
Songs with music by Michael Carr (composer)
Rock instrumentals
1961 songs
Song recordings produced by Norrie Paramor
Columbia Graphophone Company singles
The Shadows songs
1960s instrumentals
Thor Heyerdahl